The 1994–95 Challenge Cup was the 94th staging of rugby league's oldest knockout competition, the Challenge Cup. Known as the Silk Cut Challenge Cup (due to sponsorship by Silk Cut cigarettes), the tournament commenced with the first round in December 1994 and culminated in March 1995's final between Wigan and Leeds at Wembley. Wigan won the match 30–10.

First round

Second round

Third round

Fourth round

Fifth round

Quarter-finals

Semi finals

Final

The 1995 Silk Cut Challenge Cup Final was a replay of the previous season's final between Wigan and Leeds. The match was played at 2:30pm on the dry Saturday afternoon of 29 April 1995 at London's Wembley Stadium. This was the first Wembley Challenge Cup Final to use in-goal judges.

Notes

References
 
Challenge Cup official website 
Challenge Cup 1994/95 results at Rugby League Project

Challenge Cup
Challenge Cup
Challenge Cup